Dəymədağlı (also, Daymadagly and Deymedagyly) is a village and municipality in the Oghuz Rayon of Azerbaijan.  It has a population of 288.

References 

Populated places in Oghuz District